Henny Thijssen (born April 18, 1952, Enschede) is a Dutch singer-composer. He is the elder brother of singers Wilma and Reiny Landkroon.

In 1988, Thijssen received 1st place public jury and the 3rd place specialized jury with Save Our Planet in the World Songfestival in Bratislava, Slovakia. In 1998, he published Tastbaar and, in 2008, he published Levensecht.

His last singles were Tabbe Tabbe Tab (2007), Die Nacht is mijn Leven (2008; with Henri van Velzen) and Dans nog een keer met mij (2008) what was a nice success in the Netherlands Charts. Thijssen writes songs for many Dutch artists.

External links
 Official website
 Dutch music charts site

References

1952 births
Dutch musicians
Living people
People from Enschede
Date of birth missing (living people)